Matena is a small village in the west of the Netherlands. It is located in the municipality of Papendrecht, South Holland, east of the town Papendrecht.

References

Populated places in South Holland
Papendrecht